The Barney Bear series is a collection of educational video games intended for children aged 2–6, programmed by Dave Krohne with artwork by Stephen Beam. Each was published by Free Spirit Software Inc. in a departure from previous adult-oriented erotic games. The Barney Bear games are presented as interactive picture books narrated by a synthesized voice. In each game, the protagonist Barney Bear goes to a new location where players are presented with a simple story and activities.

There are five Barney Bear titles: Barney Bear Goes to School, Barney Bear Goes to the Farm, Barney Bear Goes to Space, Barney Bear Meets Santa Claus, and Barney Bears Goes Camping.

The games were well received for their intended audience of young children, particularly as a way to acclimate children to then-novel home computers.

References

External links
Barney Bear Goes to School, the first entry, on MobyGames

1990 video games
Children's educational video games
DOS games
Amiga games
Classic Mac OS games
Video games about bears
Video games developed in the United States
Video game franchises introduced in 1990